Madison is a city in Greenwood County, Kansas, United States, along the Verdigris River.  As of the 2020 census, the population of the city was 689.

History
Madison was founded in 1872 northwest of the present town. In 1879, the town was relocated to its present site when the Howard Branch of the Atchison, Topeka & Santa Fe Railroad was built from Emporia to Moline. The first building was the home of W. H. Green, a Civil War veteran. Green came to Kansas in 1867, took up a homestead, and operated a trading post on the original town site.  Madison took its name from Madison Township.

Geography
Madison is located at  (38.133014, -96.137252).

Climate
The climate in this area is characterized by hot, humid summers and generally mild to cool winters.  According to the Köppen Climate Classification system, Madison has a humid subtropical climate, abbreviated "Cfa" on climate maps.

Demographics

2010 census
As of the census of 2010, there were 701 people, 313 households, and 190 families living in the city. The racial makeup of the city was 95.1% White, 0.1% African American, 1.7% Native American, 0.1% Asian, 0.6% from other races, and 2.3% from two or more races. Hispanic or Latino of any race were 2.9% of the population.

There were 313 households, of which 26.5% had children under the age of 18 living with them, 49.8% were married couples living together, 7.3% had a female householder with no husband present, 3.5% had a male householder with no wife present, and 39.3% were non-families. 35.5% of all households were made up of individuals, and 14.3% had someone living alone who was 65 years of age or older. The average household size was 2.24 and the average family size was 3.90

The median age in the city was 42.3 years. 25.1% of residents were under the age of 18; 5.2% were between the ages of 18 and 24; 23.4% were from 25 to 44; 27.8% were from 45 to 64; and 18.3% were 65 years of age or older. The gender makeup of the city was 47.6% male and 52.4% female.

2000 census
As of the census of 2000, there were 857 people, 361 households, and 225 families living in the city. The racial makeup of the city was 96.27% White, 0.12% African American, 0.93% Native American, 0.12% Asian, 0.47% from other races, and 2.10% from two or more races. Hispanic or Latino of any race were 1.40% of the population.

There were 361 households, out of which 28.8% had children under the age of 18 living with them, 52.9% were married couples living together, 7.2% had a female householder with no husband present, and 37.4% were non-families. 34.3% of all households were made up of individuals, and 21.6% had someone living alone who was 65 years of age or older. The average household size was 2.27 and the average family size was 2.93.

In the city, the population was spread out, with 23.9% under the age of 18, 6.7% from 18 to 24, 23.5% from 25 to 44, 22.9% from 45 to 64, and 23.1% who were 65 years of age or older. The median age was 41 years. For every 100 females, there were 90.0 males. For every 100 females age 18 and over, there were 80.6 males.

The median income for a household in the city was $30,536, and the median income for a family was $40,125. Males had a median income of $25,625 versus $18,333 for females. The per capita income for the city was $15,558. About 9.1% of families and 13.1% of the population were below the poverty line, including 17.8% of those under age 18 and 9.6% of those age 65 or over.

Education
The community is served by Madison–Virgil USD 386 public school district.

The Madison Bulldogs won the Kansas State High School boys class 1A basketball championship in 1976 and the 1A football championship in 1984.

See also
 National Register of Historic Places listings in Greenwood County, Kansas

References

Further reading

External links

 City of Madison
 Madison - Directory of Public Officials
 , from Hatteberg's People on KAKE TV news
 Madison city map, KDOT

Cities in Kansas
Cities in Greenwood County, Kansas